Boholano may refer to:
Boholano people of the Philippines
Boholano dialect of Cebuano language

Language and nationality disambiguation pages